The Canterville Ghost is a 1985 American made-for-television fantasy-comedy film. This is one of many treatments based on Oscar Wilde's 1887 short story, "The Canterville Ghost".

Plot
The ghost of Sir Simon Canterville has been roaming his castle for centuries. After demonstrating cowardice in life, he must find a brave descendant to obtain rest.

Cast
 Richard Kiley as Sir Simon De Canterville
 Jenny Beck as Virginia Otis
 Shelley Fabares as Lucy
 Barry Van Dyke as John Otis
 Mary Wickes as Mrs. Umney
 Christian Jacobs as Rob
 Brian Green as Willie
 Don Knight as Mr. Smythe

See also
 List of ghost films

References

External links
 
 
 

1985 television films
1985 films
1980s comedy horror films
1985 fantasy films
1980s ghost films
American fantasy comedy films
American haunted house films
American television films
American ghost films
1980s English-language films
Films based on The Canterville Ghost
Films set in castles
Films directed by William F. Claxton
1980s American films